The Kansas City Power & Light District, or simply the Power & Light District, KCP&L or the P&L, is a dining, shopping, office and entertainment district in Downtown Kansas City, Missouri, United States, developed by The Cordish Companies of Baltimore, Maryland, and designed by Beyer Blinder Belle and 360 Architecture. The district comprises nine blocks on the south side of the downtown loop. It is located between Baltimore Avenue to the west, Grand Boulevard to the east, 12th Street to the north, and Interstate 670 to the south. The $850 million mixed use district is one of the largest development projects in the Midwestern United States, and is anchored by the renovated Midland Theatre, Alamo Drafthouse Mainstreet Cinema and the world headquarters of H&R Block. While the district was originally projected to generate enough tax revenue to pay for the bonds that were issued to finance it, the city has instead needed to rely on its general fund and refinancing to make debt payments.

In 2009, the Power & Light District was the recipient of the Urban Land Institute Award of Excellence for its impact on the revitalization of downtown Kansas City.

Location

The Power & Light District is immediately to the west of the T-Mobile Center. The district was named after the art deco Kansas City Power and Light Building. The present headquarters of the Kansas City Power & Light Company (a subsidiary of Great Plains Energy) is also located on the northern side of the district. A one-block entertainment area within the district is called Kansas City Live!, and contains two floors of bars and restaurants, as well as a large, partially enclosed courtyard and concert venue.

Kansas City Live!

At the heart of the Power & Light District is Kansas City Live!, a one block area devoted to live music and entertainment venues. At the center of Kansas City Live! is a covered outdoor plaza used for dozens of concerts each year. The stage in Kansas City Live! has featured acts like Dierks Bentley, Macklemore, the Commodores, Luke Bryan, Bleachers, Vance Joy, The Neighbourhood, Cole Swindell, Portugal. The Man, Grouplove, Foster the People, The Lumineers, Flo Rida, Travis Scott, and many more. The roof system, produced by Structurflex, is made of an Ethylene TetraFluoro Ethylene (ETFE) single-skin membrane. Construction of the roof began on August 17, 2007.

The ground floor of the Kansas City Live! block focuses on bars and restaurants, including McFadden's Sports Saloon, Flying Saucer, Cleaver & Cork, The Dubliner, Johnny's Tavern, Pizza Bar and County Road Ice House, which is a locally owned partnership between Back Napkin and Joes BBQ. The second floor of Kansas City Live! houses the night clubs and entertainment concepts, including Mosaic Ultra Lounge, Angels Rock Bar, Howl at the Moon, PBR Big Sky, Shark Bar and No Other Pub, which is a partnership between Cordish and local MLS soccer team, Sporting Kansas City.

The Kansas City Live! area of the Power & Light District was showcased before a television audience twice during May 2008. American Idol finalist David Cook played a short set from the Kansas City Live! stage on May 9, 2008, which aired during the television show the following week. The same location also hosted the official watch party for the final episode of the 2008 season, which featured a live television feed from the Power & Light District.

The Kansas City Live! block received national attention once again for its World Cup watch parties in 2010 and 2014. It was also heavily featured on Fox during the 2014 and 2015 World Series. Fox Sports Kansas City broadcast live from the Kansas City Live! stage during this time.

Notable tenants
 Alamo Drafthouse Mainstreet Theater - first all-digital movie theater in the United States; shows current movies in six theaters; located at 14th & Main (opened May 1, 2009)
 GNC -  location of the Pittsburgh-based chain of stores selling health and nutrition related products, over the counter drugs, and food supplements (opened December 31, 2008)
 Gordon Biersch Brewing Company -  location of the Chattanooga-based chain of brewery/restaurants† (opened March 10, 2008)
 H&R Block - world headquarters (opened October, 2006)
 Hilton President Kansas City - 213-room refurbished historic 1926 hotel, featuring the Drum Room (reopened January 5, 2006)
 Jos. A. Bank -  location of the Maryland-based men's clothing designer and retailer located at 1320 Main St. (opened February 13, 2009)
 Midland Theatre - 3,500-person capacity concert and live music venue (reopened September 2008)
 PBR Big Sky - country and western bar located at the north end of the Kansas City Live! block at 111 E. 13th St. (opened April 10, 2008)
 Sprint Studio -  store in the district.(opened March 5, 2008)
 T-Mobile -  store
†- located in Kansas City Live!

Residential 

Within the Power & Light District, Cordish plans to build four high-end residential towers. On April 22, 2014, Cordish broke ground on the first apartment tower called One Light Luxury Apartments. One Light officially opened 80% leased on December 8, 2015. The tower is 25 stories tall and connected to the nearby Cosentino's Grocery store and OneLife Fitness gym.

In March 2016, construction began on the second residential tower, Two Light Luxury Apartments. Two Light officially opened on May 4, 2018. The 24-story luxury apartment building features 296 units, each with floor-to-ceiling windows, like its predecessor, One Light.
Spark KC is scheduled to open in late 2018.

Festival license

In 2005, the Cordish Company successfully lobbied the Missouri General Assembly for a new law pertaining to any "entertainment district" in Downtown Kansas City which will allow patrons to remove any alcoholic beverage from any establishment in the District and carry it openly throughout the portions of the District not open to vehicular traffic, provided that the beverage is in a plastic cup marked with the logo of the establishment at which it was purchased.  The Power & Light District is one of only a few places in the United States with such an open container allowance (along with the city of Butte, Montana, the Las Vegas Strip, the city of New Orleans, Key West, Florida, the Arts and Entertainment District of Huntsville, Alabama, Beale Street in Memphis, Tennessee, and the historic district of downtown Savannah, Georgia).

See also
 Sprint Center
 Bartle Hall Convention Center

References

External links
 Power & Light District Official Website (Flash only)
 Contact Information

Neighborhoods in Kansas City, Missouri
Culture of Kansas City, Missouri
Economy of Kansas City, Missouri
Central business districts in the United States
Tourist attractions in Kansas City, Missouri
Downtown Kansas City
The Cordish Companies